Asău is a commune in Bacău County, Western Moldavia, Romania. It is composed of six villages: Apa Asău, Asău, Ciobănuș, Lunca Asău, Păltiniș and Straja.

References

Communes in Bacău County
Localities in Western Moldavia